Melanamphora is a genus of fungi within the Melanconidaceae family. It is a monotypic genus, containing the single species Melanamphora spinifera.

References

External links
 Melanamphora at Index Fungorum

Melanconidaceae
Monotypic Sordariomycetes genera